Two of a Kind is the second album by Earl Klugh and Bob James, released in 1982. The album received a  nomination for Best Selling Jazz Album at the NARM Awards in 1983, and peaked at No.1 on the Billboard Jazz chart in January 1983.

Critical reception

Ron Wynn of AllMusic writes, "Keyboardist Bob James and acoustic guitarist Earl Klugh struck gold with this session."

Billboard'''s Top Album Picks for the week ending 11 June 1982 listed Two of a Kind in the Jazz section.

Track listing

 Musicians 
 Bob James – keyboards
 Earl Klugh – acoustic guitar
 Gary King – bass
 Harvey Mason – drums
 Leonard "Doc" Gibbs, Jr. – percussion
 Sammy Figueroa – percussion

Production

 Producers – Bob James and Earl Klugh
 Engineer and Mixed by Joe Jorgensen
 Assistant Engineer – Ron Carran
 Assistant Engineer – Bruce Robbins
 Mastered by Vlado Meller at CBS Recording Studios (New York City, NY).
 Microphotography – John Paul Endress
 Portrait Photography – David Gahr
 Design – Bob Heimall
 Production Coordinator – Marion Orr
 Art Direction, Design Concept – Peter Paul

Track information and credits adapted from AllMusic''. Track information and credits also verified from the album's liner notes.

Charts

References 

1982 albums
Earl Klugh albums
Bob James (musician) albums
Albums produced by Bob James (musician)
Manhattan Records albums